The Archdiocese of Mexico is a Latin Church ecclesiastical territory or archdiocese of the Catholic Church that is situated in Mexico City, Mexico. It was erected as a diocese on 2 September 1530 and elevated to an archdiocese on 12 February 1546. The archdiocese is one of the largest in the world, with over four million Catholics, surpassed only by Guadalajara, São Paulo and Milan.

Prior to 2019, the archdiocese was the largest in the world, with nearly 8 million Catholics. In September 2019, Pope Francis approved the division of the archdiocese, erecting three new suffragan dioceses from its territory: Azcapotzalco, Iztapalapa, and Xochimilco. These are the only three suffragans within the ecclesiastical province of which the archdiocese is the metropolitan see. Today, the archdiocese's territory comprises most of Mexico City, with the exception of the three new dioceses, each of which is coextensive with its eponymous borough.

The cathedra of the archdiocese is found within the Metropolitan Cathedral in Mexico City.

Bishops

Ordinaries

Ordinaries who became Cardinals:
Miguel Darío Miranda y Gómez, in 1969
Ernesto Corripio y Ahumada, in 1979
Norberto Rivera Carrera, in 1998
Carlos Aguiar Retes, in 2016 while Archbishop of Tlalnepantla

Coadjutor archbishop
Miguel Darío Cardinal Miranda y Gómez (1955–1956); future Cardinal

Current auxiliary bishops

Rogelio Esquivel Medina (appointed 27 June 2001)
Salvador González Morales (appointed 16 February 2019)
Carlos Enrique Samaniego López (appointed 16 February 2019)
Luis Manuel Pérez Raygoza (appointed 25 January 2020)
Héctor Mario Pérez Villarreal (appointed 25 January 2020)

Former auxiliary bishops 
 Juan Manuel de Irrizarri y Peralta (27 April 1840 – 27 March 1849)
 Maximino Ruiz y Flores (8 March 1920 – 11 May 1949)
 Francisco Orozco Lomelín (19 March 1952 – 17 October 1990)
 José Villalón Mercado (1 April 1952 – 12 September 1977)
 Alfredo Torres Romero (30 December 1967 – 4 January 1975), appointed Coadjutor Bishop of Aguascalientes
 Luis Mena Arroyo (13 July 1961 – 1 September 1964), appointed Coadjutor Archbishop of Chihuahua; returned here as Auxiliary Bishop (27 July 1979 – 9 September 1995), with personal title of Archbishop
 Jorge Martínez Martínez (5 June 1971 – 1 August 1994)
 Javier Lozano Barragán (5 June 1979 – 28 October 1984), appointed Bishop of Zacatecas; future Cardinal
 Francisco María Aguilera González (5 June 1979 – 12 January 1996)
 Carlos Talavera Ramírez (15 January 1980 – 14 March 1984), appointed Bishop of Coatzacoalcos, Veracruz
 Genaro Alamilla Arteaga (26 January 1980 – 10 October 1989)
 Ricardo Watty Urquidi, M.Sp.S. (27 May 1980 – 6 November 1989), appointed Bishop of Nuevo Laredo, Tamaulipas
 Abelardo Alvarado Alcántara (26 April 1985 – 22 July 2008)
 José de Jesús Martínez Zepeda (11 March 1997 – 3 January 2004), appointed Bishop of Irapuato, Guanajuato
 Marcelino Hernández Rodríguez (5 January 1998 – 23 February 2008), appointed Bishop of Orizaba, Veracruz
 José Luis Fletes Santana (29 January 2000 – 31 May 2003)
 Guillermo Rodrigo Teodoro Ortiz Mondragón (29 January 2000 – 19 October 2005), appointed Bishop of Cuautitlán, México
 Felipe Tejeda García, M.Sp.S. (29 January 2000 – 30 July 2010)
 Jonás Guerrero Corona (27 June 2001 – 18 March 2011), appointed Bishop of Culiacán, Sinaloa
 Francisco Clavel Gil (27 June 2001 – 28 May 2013)
Antonio Ortega Franco, C.O. (11 February 2004 – 16 February 2019)
 José Víctor Manuel Valentín Sánchez Espinosa (2 March 2004 – 5 February 2009), appointed Archbishop of Puebla de los Ángeles, Puebla
 Carlos Briseño Arch, O.A.R. (20 May 2006 - 12 November 2018), appointed Bishop of Veracruz
Florencio Armando Colín Cruz (27 November 2008 - 16 February 2019), appointed Bishop of Puerto Escondido, Oaxaca
Crispin Ojeda Márquez (4 June 2011	- 27 July 2018), appointed Bishop of Tehuantepec, Oaxaca
 Jorge Estrada Solórzano (28 May 2013 – 11 May 2019), appointed Bishop of Gómez Palacio, Durango
Francisco Daniel Rivera Sánchez, M.Sp.S. (appointed 25 January 2020 – died 18 January 2021)

Other priests of the archdiocese who became bishops 
 Bernardo Gárate y López de Arizmendi (15 December 1819 – 19 March 1863), appointed Bishop of Querétaro
 Manuel Fulcheri y Pietrasanta (17 December 1898 – 6 May 1912), appointed Bishop of Cuernavaca
 Gerardo Anaya y Diez de Bonilla (2 April 1904 – 8 March 1920), appointed Bishop of Chiapas (Ciudad Real de Chiapas)
 Arturo Vélez Martínez (29 June 1934 – 8 February 1951), appointed Bishop of Toluca

Territorial losses

Education

Colleges, universities, and seminaries

Secondary schools

Former colleges, universities, and seminaries

References

External links and references
Arquidiócesis Primada de México official site (in Spanish)

 
Religion in Mexico City
Roman Catholic dioceses in Mexico
Religious organizations established in the 1530s
1530 establishments in New Spain
1530s establishments in Mexico
Religious organizations established in the 1540s
1546 establishments in New Spain
Roman Catholic dioceses established in the 16th century
A
Roman Catholic ecclesiastical provinces in Mexico